Shrutinandan is an Indian classical music academy located in Kolkata, India. It is run by vocalist, Pandit Ajoy Chakrabarty.

History
Shrutinandan was inaugurated on the July 1997.
 Its objective is towards the promotion of music and identifying young talent and training them on Hindustani music.

Research
The academy carries out research in Hindustani classical music in order to restore some of the undocumented works by the great 
maestros.

References

External links
 Official site

Hindustani music organisations
Music schools in India
Education in Kolkata
Educational institutions established in 1997
1997 establishments in West Bengal